Gaius Sulpicius Paterculus served as a consul to the Roman Republic in 258 BC, together with Aulus Atilius Calatinus. He succeeded Lucius Cornelius Scipio who was the second consul of 259.

Punic War 
Gaius Sulpicius Paterculus served as a commander in the First Punic War in Sicily, and the Roman victory at the Battle of Sulci is credited to him. An account of his campaign stated that the Roman legions in Sicily were achieving very little until his arrival together with the Calatinus. The consuls advanced towards the Carthaginian army in its winter quarters in Panormus and deployed the entire Roman army close to the city. The enemy refused to fight so the Romans turned towards the town of Hippana, Myttistratum, Camarina, Enna and other Carthaginian strongholds, which they all captured.

Gaius Sulpicius Paterculus also led several successful attacks on the African coast. He was awarded a Roman triumph "over the Carthaginians and Sardinia".

See also 
 Sulpicia (gens)

References 

3rd-century BC Roman consuls
Ancient Roman generals
Paterculus, Gaius